South Mayo was a parliamentary constituency in Ireland, which returned one Member of Parliament (MP) to the House of Commons of the Parliament of the United Kingdom, elected on a system of first-past-the-post, from 1885 to 1922.

Prior to the 1885 general election the area was part of the two-seat Mayo constituency. From 1922, on the establishment of the Irish Free State, it was not represented in the UK Parliament.

Boundaries
This constituency comprised the southern part of County Mayo. In 1918, the constituency expanded to take in the district electoral divisions of Ballinchalla and Owenbrin from County Galway which had been transferred into County Mayo under the 1898 Local Government Act.

1885–1918: The baronies of Clanmorris and Kilmaine, that part of the barony of Costello contained within the parishes of Aghamore, Annagh, Bekan and Knock, and that part of the barony of Carra contained within the parish of Ballyovey.

1918–1922: The existing South Mayo constituency together with that part of the Connemara constituency contained in the administrative county of Mayo.

Members of Parliament

Elections

Elections in the 1880s

Elections in the 1890s

Elections in the 1900s

Elections in the 1910s

References

Westminster constituencies in County Mayo (historic)
Dáil constituencies in the Republic of Ireland (historic)
Constituencies of the Parliament of the United Kingdom established in 1885
Constituencies of the Parliament of the United Kingdom disestablished in 1922